{{DISPLAYTITLE:C9H6O3}}
The molecular formula C9H6O3 (molar mass: 162.14 g/mol, exact mass: 162.031694 u) may refer to:

 Umbelliferone, also known as 7-hydroxycoumarin or hydrangine
 4-Hydroxycoumarin

Molecular formulas